The Cornwall Super Cup is an annual English Rugby Union club competition founded in 2007, organized by the Cornwall Rugby Football Union and was last sponsored by Tribute Ales. Previously the competition was  competed for by the top three Cornish national league teams (tier 3 and below of the English rugby union league system) - Redruth, Camborne and Launceston.  Currently, the competition is competed for by Camborne and Launceston, due to the fact that they are the top Cornish sides that are in the same division (South West Premier - tier 5), with Redruth one division higher in National League 2 South.

The Cornish Super Cup was originally introduced for the 2007-08 (then sponsored by Skinner's Brewery) as a 6-game round robin competition between three of the county's top sides, including Launceston (National 1), Mounts Bay (National 3 South) and Redruth (National 2), with the notable exception being the Cornish Pirates (National 1).  This would mean that these sides would no longer participate in the Cornwall Senior Cup as they had previously.  By the end of the season the lowest ranked team in terms of division, Mounts Bay, were the champions having defeated the Launceston at the final held at the Mennaye Field.

For the following season the competition expanded to include the Cornish Pirates.  The intention was that all four teams would play each other twice in a group stage – with the top two teams meeting at the final at Tregorrick Park in St Austell.  Owing a variety of reasons (mostly fixture congestion) a large number of games were un-played and the CRFU had to cancel the competition.  Since this cancellation the cup has been played between the Launceston and Redruth as a two legged final (separate from league games) for 2009-10 before switching to the current system of doubling up as league games after a hiatus of several years.  At the moment the Launceston and Redruth are in the same division so playing the cup as part of the league helps avoid the fixture congestion that plagued previous versions although with Launceston's relegation from the 2015–16 National League 2 South the future of the Cornish Super Cup is uncertain.

Despite Launceston's relegation, the Cornish Super Cup would return for the 2015–16 season.  This time the cup would feature three Cornish teams - with National League 3 South West newcomers Camborne being added to face Launceston (National League 3 South West) and local rivals Redruth (National League 2 South) - and the format changing to that of a mini league.  Following Launceston's second successive relegation the competition has since been discontinued as no teams are in the same division.

After a gap of 2 seasons, the Cornwall Super Cup returned for the 2019–20 season.  This time it would be contested by Camborne and Launceston only - with both sides league fixtures against each in South West Premier (tier 5) counting towards the cup.

Cornwall Super Cup honours

Number of wins
 Redruth (3)
 Camborne (1)
 Launceston (1)
 Mounts Bay (1)

Cornwall Super Cup fixtures and results

2009–10

Redruth win 48–29 on aggregate.

2013–14

Launceston win 39-28 on aggregate.

2014–15

Redruth win 29-28 on aggregate.

2015–16

Redruth win 51-17 on aggregate.

2016–17

The 2016–17 season would see a change in the cup. While before the cup was a two-legged competition played home and away, the addition of an extra team meant that it would be changed to a league format with each side playing each other home and away for a total of six games in all.  As Camborne and Launceston were in the same league the two league matches between the sides would double up as Super Cup fixtures along with the traditional Rodda's Cup fixture between Redruth and Camborne.  The remaining fixtures between Launceston and Redruth would take place on weekend dates free of league rugby.  At the end of the six matches the top two sides were supposed meet in final to be held in May 2017.

Despite beating Camborne in the traditional Boxing Day fixture, Redruth would drop out of the competition, leaving Camborne and Launceston to compete for the cup.   This meant that the May final was cancelled and instead the two league fixtures between Camborne and Launceston in National League 3 South West would count towards the Super Cup, with Camborne ultimately winning their first ever Super Cup, defeating Launceston 61-30 on aggregate.  

National League 3 South West league & Super Cup double header.

Rodda's Milk Cup & Super Cup double header.  Result would not count in the Super Cup after Redruth's later withdrawal from the competition.

Cancelled by mutual agreement as neither team could guarantee a side.

National League 3 South West league & Super Cup double header.

Game cancelled as Redruth would withdraw from the competition due to National League 2 South league commitments.

Game cancelled.

2016–17 final table

2019–20

Notes

See also

 Cornwall RFU
 Cornwall Cup
 Cornwall Clubs Cup
 English rugby union system
 Rugby union in England

Notes

References

External links
 Trelawny's Army

Recurring sporting events established in 2007
Rugby union cup competitions in England
Rugby union in Cornwall
2007 establishments in England